Charles John Robert Manners, 10th Duke of Rutland,  (28 May 1919 – 4 January 1999), styled Marquess of Granby until 1940, was a British peer and landowner.

Biography

He was the son of John Manners, 9th Duke of Rutland, by his wife Kathleen Tennant, granddaughter of Sir Charles Tennant, 1st Baronet.  Rutland was educated at Eton and Trinity College, Cambridge. He was a younger brother of Lady Ursula d'Abo.

He served in the British Army during World War II, becoming a captain in the Grenadier Guards.

He inherited the title in 1940, remaining in that estate until his death in 1999.

A lifelong Conservative, the Duke served on Leicestershire County Council as the County Councillor for the Vale of Belvoir Division from 1945 until 1985. He was Chairman of Leicestershire County Council from 1974 until 1977.

He was made a Commander of the Order of the British Empire in the 1962 New Year Honours "for political and public services in the East Midlands".

Marriages and issue
He married twice:
Firstly on 27 April 1946 to Anne Bairstow Cumming Bell, daughter of William Cumming Bell and Joan Middlemost Cumming Bell, née Bairstow, whom he divorced in 1956, having had one daughter:
Lady Charlotte Louise Manners (born 7 January 1947)
Secondly on 15 May 1958 he married Frances Helen Sweeny, daughter of Charles Francis Sweeny, an American amateur golfer, socialite and businessman, by his first wife the wealthy Scottish-born heiress Margaret Whigham, since 1951 Duchess of Argyll, having married secondly Ian Douglas Campbell, 11th Duke of Argyll. By his second wife he had four children:
David Charles Robert Manners, 11th Duke of Rutland (born 8 May 1959), eldest son and heir;
Lord Robert George Manners (18 June 1961 – 28 February 1964), died aged 2;
Lord Edward (John Francis) Manners (born 29 May 1965); he married Gabrielle Ross in 2013
Lady (Helen) Theresa (Margaret) Manners (born 11 November 1962), who in her youth was the lead singer of the short-lived 1980s British rock band "The Business Connection", founded by Henry Somerset, Marquess of Worcester (later 12th Duke of Beaufort). She married Dr John Chipman, director of the International Institute for Strategic Studies.

References

1919 births
1999 deaths
110
Charles
Commanders of the Order of the British Empire
People educated at Eton College
Tennant family
Alumni of Trinity College, Cambridge
British landowners
C
20th-century British businesspeople
British Army personnel of World War II
Grenadier Guards officers
20th-century English nobility